The 2016 Watford Borough Council election took place on 5 May 2016 to elect members of Watford Borough Council in England. This was on the same day as other nationwide local elections. The entire council was up for election, with each of the 12 wards electing 3 councillors.

This result had the following consequences for the total number of seats on the Council after the elections:

Results Summary

Ward results

Callowland

Central

Holywell

Leggatts

Meriden

Nascot

Oxhey

Park

Stanborough

Tudor

Vicarage

Woodside

References

External links

2016 English local elections
2016
2010s in Hertfordshire